Wiesław Król (born 3 June 1938) is a Polish hurdler. He competed in the men's 400 metres hurdles at the 1960 Summer Olympics.

References

1938 births
Living people
Athletes (track and field) at the 1960 Summer Olympics
Polish male hurdlers
Olympic athletes of Poland
People from Drohobych
People from Lwów Voivodeship
Universiade medalists in athletics (track and field)
Universiade bronze medalists for Poland
Medalists at the 1959 Summer Universiade
Medalists at the 1961 Summer Universiade
20th-century Polish people